Luis Francisco Sánchez Mosquera (born 18 September 2000) is a Colombian footballer who plays as a midfielder for América de Cali.

Career

Sánchez started his career with América de Cali in Colombia.

In 2019, Sánchez was sent on loan to the reserves of French Ligue 1 side Saint-Étienne, but found it hard to adapt due to the language difference.

References

External links
 
 

Colombian footballers
Colombian expatriates in France
América de Cali footballers
Expatriate footballers in France
2000 births
People from Cúcuta
Living people
Association football midfielders
Championnat National 2 players
Categoría Primera A players
Colombian expatriate footballers
Colombian expatriate sportspeople in France